Amorio may refer to:

Amorio, Evros, a town in the Evros regional unit, Greece
Amorium, an ancient city in Phrygia, near modern Emirdağ, Turkey
Tikal Amorio, a variety of wine
Amori (film), a 2019 Indian film